Tobias Kamke was the defending champion and successfully defended his title, defeating Paul-Henri Mathieu in the final, 1–6, 6–3, 7–5.

Seeds

Draw

Finals

Top half

Bottom half

References
 Main Draw
 Qualifying Draw

ATP Roller Open - Singles
2013 Singles
2013 in Luxembourgian tennis